Hall in Tirol is a town in the Innsbruck-Land district of Tyrol, Austria. Located at an altitude of 574 m, about 5 km (3 mi) east of the state's capital Innsbruck in the Inn valley, it has a population of about 13,000 (Jan 2013).

History
Hall in the County of Tyrol was first mentioned as a salina (saltern) near Thaur castle in a 1232 deed. The current name dates back to 1256, and similarly to Halle, Hallein, Schwäbisch Hall or Hallstatt is derived from the Celtic word for salt.

Since the 13th century, the salt mine at Absam in the Hall Valley north of the town formed the main industry of the town and its surroundings. The first adit was laid out in 1272 at the behest of Count Meinhard II of Tyrol, with the brine channeled by a 10 km (6 mi) long pipeline to the evaporation pond at Hall. The importance of the salt industry, which exported goods as far as Switzerland, the Black Forest, and the Rhine valley, is reflected in Hall's coat of arms, which shows two lions holding a cask of salt. In 1303, Hall became a town. The rights that came with this, as well as the business associated with trading from Hall downriver on Inn and Danube, turned it into the leading market and trading place in the northern parts of Tyrol. Its development suffered a serious setback in 1447, when large parts of the upper town area were razed by a fire. In 1477, it got the right of coinage, when the Tyrolian mint was moved from Meran to Hall. In 1486, the mint produced the first large silver coin Guldengroschen in Europe. In the 16th century, the mint in Hall also introduced the world's first automated coining machine. Today a reconstruction of this revolutionary machine can be seen in the Hall Mint Museum  in the Burg Hasegg.

In the 15th and 16th centuries, Hall was one of the most important towns in the Habsburg Empire. This period saw the construction of many of the churches, monasteries and convents that still shape the appearance of the town. Today Hall has the biggest intact old town in the western part of Austria.

During the Habsburg monarchy, a military garrison was established in Hall. This, along with the large freight train station, became a target of heavy bombardment during World War II, which destroyed the train station but left the old town almost unscathed.

From 1938 to 1974, the town was called Solbad Hall. "Solbad" was dropped from the town name a few years after the salt mine was closed in 1967.

Population

Gallery

Notable people
 Klaus Dibiasi, Olympic diving champion.
 Janine Flock, skeleton racer.
 David Gleirscher, Olympic luge gold medalist.
 Christoph Grienberger, the Jesuit astronomer.

Town twinning 
Hall in Tirol is twinned with:
 Iserlohn, Germany, since 1967
 Winterthur, Switzerland
 Sommacampagna, Italy

Climate
Climate type is dominated by the winter season, a long, bitterly cold period with short, clear days, relatively little precipitation mostly in the form of snow, and low humidity.  The Köppen Climate Classification subtype for this climate is "Dfc" (Continental Subarctic Climate).

External links 
 City-Tour with many pictures of Hall in Tirol

References 

Cities and towns in Innsbruck-Land District
Populated places on the Inn (river)